Odeon may refer to:

Ancient Greek and Roman buildings
 Odeon (building), ancient Greek and Roman buildings built for singing exercises, musical shows and poetry competitions
 Odeon of Agrippa, Athens
 Odeon of Athens
 Odeon of Domitian, Rome
 Odeon of Herodes Atticus, Athens
 Odeon of Lyon, France
 Odeon of Philippopolis, Plovdiv, Bulgaria
 Odeon theater (Amman), Jordan

Modern places of entertainment
 Odéon-Théâtre de l'Europe, in Paris, France
 Odeon Theatre (disambiguation), the name of several theatres
 Odeon Cinemas, a cinema brand name in the UK, Ireland and Norway
 Odeon Cinemas Group
 Odeon Kino, a cinema group in Norway 
 Odeon Cinema, Barnet, London, England
 Odeon Cinema, Bilston, England
 Odeon, Kingstanding, Birmingham, England
 Odeon Leeds-Bradford, Bradford, England
 Former Odeon cinemas in Leeds, England
 Odeon Leicester Square, London, England
 Odeon Marble Arch, London, England
 Odeon West End, Leicester Square, London, England
 Odeon Cinema, Manchester, England
 Odeon Sheffield, Sheffield, England
 Odeon Cinema, Weston-super-Mare, England
 Birmingham Odeon, England
 Bradford Odeon, England
 Lewisham Odeon, London, England
 Newcastle Odeon, England
 Odeon Theatre, Hobart, Tasmania, Australia
 Odeon Events Centre, now Coors Event Centre, in Saskatoon, Canada
 Odeon, Boston, in Boston, Massachusetts, U.S., 1835 – c. 1846
 Odeon (Munich), a former concert hall in Munich, Germany
 Odeon Newport, now The NEON, in Newport, Wales
 Cineplex Odeon, a cinema theatre brand of Cineplex Entertainment
List of Cineplex Entertainment movie theatres
 Hammersmith Odeon, now the Hammersmith Apollo, in London, England

Other uses
 Odeon (album), a 2013 music album by Tosca
 "Odeon", a composition by Ernesto Nazareth (1863–1934)
 Odéon (Paris Métro), a station in Paris, France
 Odeon Film, a German film production company
 Odeon Records, a German record label
 Odeon Tower, a residential skyscraper in Monaco
 Odeon 24, an Italian television network
 Cineplex Odeon Films, or Odeon Films, a former film distributor

See also

 Nickelodeon (movie theater)
 Odium (disambiguation)
 Odiham, a village in Hampshire, England